Operation Assured Delivery was the United States Armed Forces' logistical support to humanitarian aid efforts in Georgia following the Russo-Georgian War in 2008. The operation provided medical supplies, shelter, food and personal hygiene items for the civilian population of Georgia.

Deployment of U.S. Forces

U.S. Air Force
As of August 27, 2008, the U.S. Air Force had flown 55 airlift sorties delivering 1,944,000 pounds of supplies since 13 August.

U.S. Navy
As of August 27, 2008, the U.S. Navy destroyer USS McFaul had delivered 155,000 pounds of humanitarian supplies to the port of Batumi. In addition, the command ship USS Mount Whitney arrived in the Georgian main port of Poti on September 5 with additional supplies.

U.S. Coast Guard
As of August 27, 2008, the U.S. Coast Guard cutter USCGC Dallas had delivered 76,000 pounds of aid for displaced persons.

Russian reaction
Russian President Dmitry Medvedev accused the States of using Operation Assured Delivery as a cover for delivering military support to Georgia. Media reported have suggested that USS McFaul docked in the Georgian-controlled port of Batumi, rather than the primary Georgian port of Poti which was controlled by Russians at time.

However, the USS Mount Whitney docked in Poti. Russian authorities were concerned about the ship's arrival, claiming that the ship's size and weight suggested that it was not bringing humanitarian aid, but instead bringing significant U.S. military weapons. The source also noted that the Mount Whitney was a command-and-control vessel coordinating a group of NATO ships in the Black Sea.

See also
Georgia-NATO relations

References

External links 
Operation Assured Delivery

Russo-Georgian War
21st-century military history of the United States
August 2008 events in Asia
September 2008 events in Asia